Darbar is a 2020 Indian Tamil-language action thriller film written and directed by A. R. Murugadoss and produced by Allirajah Subaskaran under Lyca Productions. It stars Rajinikanth, Nayanthara, Nivetha Thomas and Suniel Shetty. The music was composed by Anirudh Ravichander with cinematography and editing performed by Santosh Sivan and A. Sreekar Prasad, respectively. In the film Aaditya, the commissioner of Mumbai Police, sets out to catch Ajay, a drug peddler. However, he uncovers a deeper controversy linked to an international drug lord and must mete out justice.

Darbar marks Rajinikanth playing the role of a police officer after 27 years; his last police role was in Pandiyan (1992). It follows Aaditya Arunasalam (Rajinikanth), the commissioner of Mumbai Police, who sets out to curb rampant drug-trafficking and prostitution in the city. However, when he uncovers a deeper controversy linked to an international drug lord, he tries to fulfill his secret agenda. Earlier known under the working title Thalaivar 167, the title Darbar was officially announced on 9 April 2019. Principal photography commenced in April 2019, with film being primarily shot in Mumbai, and was completed in October 2019.

The film was released theatrically in India on 9 January 2020, coinciding with Thai Pongal. Although met with mixed reviews upon release, the film grossed  crore at the box office, making it one of Rajinikanth's highest-grossing films and the highest-grossing Tamil films of 2020.  However, it was considered a poor performer, which caused distributors to threaten hunger strikes, demanding that Rajinikanth recoup their losses.

Plot 
  
Mumbai Police Commissioner Aditya Arunachalam is seen killing numerous gangsters across Mumbai in police encounters. His reckless behavior has become the subject of widespread condemnation, which prompts the National Human Rights Commission of India to act against him. One of the panelists on the commission, and a former friend of Aditya, discovers that his ruthlessness is due to the murder of his daughter Valli.

A year ago, Aditya is assigned to Mumbai as the new Commissioner to curb the rampant drug-trafficking and prostitution in the city. Upon arriving in Mumbai, he rescues three kidnapped women, one of whom is the daughter of the Deputy CM of Maharashtra. Sensing an opportunity, Aditya uses the kidnapped women as an excuse to initiate a campaign against the city's drug-trafficking and prostitution rings; his efforts are extremely successful, with numerous drug-dealers, and child-traffickers arrested. Among the arrested is Ajay Malhotra, who is the son of Vinod Malhotra, an influential industrialist. Vinod initially attempts to bail Ajay out, only to be thwarted by Aditya. While seeking Ajay's testimony on his involvement in drug-smuggling, Aditya visits him in prison, only to discover a proxy in his place. He requests both the state and central governments to investigate, only to further discover that the officials assigned to Ajay's case, are working under Vinod's payroll. Through a covert investigation, Aditya learns that Ajay is hiding in Bangkok, and has the Royal Thai Police arrest him on charges of passport fraud. However, corrupt diplomats under Vinod's payroll, falsely declare that "Ajay" is still incarcerated in India, which leads to his release from Thai custody. Undeterred, Aditya returns to India, and has the proxy killed under the guise of self-defense, while simultaneously announcing that "Ajay's" corpse, while be displayed to the media. Cornered and with no other options, Vinod's accomplices turn against him; in order to save themselves, they have Ajay secretly brought back to India and killed.

However, at Ajay's wake, it is revealed that Ajay isn't actually Vinod's son, but that of Hariharan Chopra, one of the most dreaded mafia boss in the world, responsible for a brutal massacre of 57 policemen in Mumbai. Concurrently, Hari learns of Ajay's murder in London. Vying for revenge, he secretly enters India via the Indo-Bangladesh border. Fearing for his life, Vinod contacts Aditya's daughter Valli, warning her that Aditya is in danger. Hari later stabs Vinod for his inability to protect Ajay. He targets Aditya and Valli as well, and attacks the duo by orchestrating a gruesome car accident. Although Aditya survives the attack, Valli is diagnosed with a subdural hematoma. The doctor tells her that she has only 2 hours to live after which, she will die. Crestfallen, she makes a self-recording for Aditya and dies.

Heartbroken on hearing about Valli's death, Aditya turns violent. Believing Vinod to be responsible, Aditya barges into his residence, only to learn about his murder. Enraged and confused, Aditya sets out to decipher the truth behind Valli's death, killing numerous gangsters in the process, which brings the film back to the present. Back in the present, Aditya and his subordinates are ambushed by Hari's goons. Although they survive the attack, Aditya is suspended for his rash behavior. Almost on the verge of giving up, he discovers Valli's video, which reveals about Vinod's earlier warning; Valli also encourages Aditya to persevere and to continue investigating. Emboldened with renewed confidence, Aditya manages to get reinstated into the police force, by proving his physical and mental stability. He subsequently traces Ajay's true biological origins back to Hari. Attempting to evade Aditya, Hari organizes the murders of numerous policemen. Undeterred, Aditya manages to trace Hari's location, back to the old office building of Mumbai Media, owned by media conglomerate Pramod Gupta, who is revealed to be one of Hari's associates. With the help of the police force, Aditya launches a raid on the complex. He manages to kill Hari's goons and captures Gupta; he fails to capture Hari himself. Hari retreats to the site of his infamous massacre, and lures Aditya to him, by holding the families of the deceased police officers as hostage at gunpoint. Aditya battles it out with Hari and ends up victorious. Hari attempts to shoot Aditya but he stabs Hari ending Hari's reign of terror, avenging Valli's death, and ensuring peace in Mumbai.

Cast 

 Rajinikanth as Aaditya Arunachalam IPS, commissioner of the Mumbai police and Valli's father
 Nayanthara as Lilly, Aaditya's love interest
 Nivetha Thomas as Vallikkannu (daughter of Aaditya)
 Suniel Shetty as Hariharan "Hari" Chopra, Ajay's real father 
 Yogi Babu as Kaushik, Aaditya's friend
 Prateik Babbar as Ajay Chopra a.k.a. Ajay Malhotra
 Nawab Shah as Vinod Malhotra/Vinod Prathap (Ajay's adopted father)
 Sriman as Lilly's cousin
 Dalip Tahil as Union Home Secretary
 Yograj Singh as the head of the gangsters
 Jatin Sarna as a gangster
 Adithya Shivpink as Ajay's proxy
 Shamata Anchan as a police inspector
 Raneesh Thyagarajan as a police inspector
 Shreya Gupta as Minister's daughter
 Sanjay Raghavan as a police inspector
 Soundariya Nanjundan as Lilly's cousin
 Manasvi Kottachi as Lilly's niece
 Rajesh Chintu as a police inspector
 Anitha Sampath as a newsreader
 Yusuf Hussain as Doctor
 C. Ranganathan as Lilly's father (special appearance in the song "Dumm Dumm")
 Jeeva Subramanian as a dancer in the song "Kannula Thimiru"
 Sumit Giri as a police inspector
 Taiyaba Mansuri as a Police daughter

Production

Development 

In March 2015, Rajinikanth was reported to sign his next film with A. R. Murugadoss and backed by Venu Ravichandran of Aascar Films; the project was reported to be put on hold until his issue with the distributors over the financial losses of his film Lingaa (2014), being sorted out. However, the project failed to materialize, citing Ravichandran's bankruptcy.

On 25 September 2018, reports surfaced that Rajinikanth would collaborate with Murugadoss, for his next project, and would be bankrolled by Sun Pictures, who also produced the latter's Sarkar (2018), and the former's Petta (2019). However, on 25 November 2018, Lyca Productions announced that they would collaborate with Rajinikanth and Murugadoss again after their previous collaboration of the former's 2.0 (2018) and the latter's Kaththi (2014) . At an awards ceremony held in December 2018, Murugadoss refuted the claims of the film's title as Narkaali, and further stated that "the film is not a political genre as of my previous hits, but it will be a commercial mass entertainer".

Production of the film began with the working title Thalaivar 167. Music director Anirudh Ravichander and cinematographer Santosh Sivan, openly confirmed their presence in the film. On 29 March 2019, Murugadoss offered a visit to the Pazhani Murugan temple, to perform a special pooja (prayer ceremony) for the success of the film, and also announced the title and release date of the film. On 9 April 2019, the film's first look poster were released by Lyca Productions on the social media platforms, which revealed the title of the film as Darbar. The first look of Rajinikanth had him surrounded by police dogs, belts, badges and handcuffs. It marks Rajinikanth playing the role of a police officer in the film after 27 years, whose last police role being featured in Pandiyan (1992). In an interview, director Murugadoss stated the film is about a tough cop like Alex Pandiyan, a character from the film Moondru Mugam (1982).

Casting 
Nayanthara was confirmed to play the female lead in the film, collaborating with Rajinikanth for the third time, after Chandramukhi (2005) and Sivaji: The Boss (2007), despite playing a cameo in the latter. It was earlier reported that Bollywood actor Prateik Babbar would play the main antagonist in Darbar. However, later reports showed that Suniel Shetty was cast as the lead antagonist, marking his full-fledged debut in Tamil cinema. Shetty agreed to play the antagonist despite declining previous offers to play the antagonist in other Tamil films. Murugadoss approached Shetty while he was filming for Marakkar for which Shetty grew his hair long. Murugadoss wanted to do something special with Shetty's long hair. Shetty showed Murugadoss the look of his man bun, which was ultimately used for the film. In an interview, Shetty revealed how Darbar is his first "meaty" role in Tamil cinema. Yogi Babu makes his collaboration with Rajinikanth for the first time, through this film.

Filming 
On 4 April, a photoshoot featuring Rajinikanth was held at the popular studio in Chennai, with renowned photographer Venket Ram, and costumes designed by Niharika Bhasin Khan. The stills which were unofficially leaked into the internet, featured the actor in a cop avatar. Principal photography for the film began on 10 April 2019 in Mumbai. Few stills featuring Rajinikanth, Nivetha Thomas and Yogi Babu were leaked into the internet. On 3 May 2019, the shoot of the film has been put on hold, following reports of friction with college students at a campus where the movie was being filmed, which were resumed later. The film's first schedule was completed on 15 May.

The second schedule of the film was resumed on 29 May and wrapped up within 30 June. Suniel Shetty joined the film's second schedule. On 5 June 2019, a video from the shooting spot unofficially made its way through the internet, despite high security in the sets. The filmmakers reported a similar incident during the film's shoot on the last week of June 2019. The team shifted the location from Mumbai to Delhi, citing heavy rains. It was reported that the film would be wrapped up in late August 2019.

After completing, the second schedule of the film, the makers took a 10-day long break, to resume the shoot from 10 July 2019. On 25 July, Murugadoss shared a few stills from the film, featuring Rajinikanth holds a sword in his hand and can be seen walking through a cloud of dust in a policeman's uniform in the first still, and in the other image sees him happier in a light blue suit. The final schedule of the film took place on 19 August 2019 in Jaipur, where a couple of action sequences were shot. On 11 October 2019, the makers announced that they had completed the shooting of the film. On 7 November 2019, Rajinikanth started dubbing for the film in Chennai, and completed within two days.

Music

The film's soundtrack and score were composed by Anirudh Ravichander, marking his second collaboration with Rajinikanth after Petta (2019) and also with director A. R. Murugadoss after Kaththi (2014). An instrumental theme song for the film titled "Thalaivar Theme", that accompanied with the motion poster was released on 7 November 2019. The film's first single, "Chumma Kizhi", with lyrics by Vivek and sung by S. P. Balasubrahmanyam, was released on 27 November 2019. The film's album was launched on 7 December 2019 at Jawaharlal Nehru Indoor Stadium, Chennai, in the presence of the film's cast and crew in attendance, and was simultaneously made available to stream through the online music streaming platform Gaana, on the same day itself.

Post the album release, the film's soundtrack has an unreleased hidden song, titled "Kannula Thimiru", which were recorded by three transwomen singers  Chandramukhi, Rachana and Priya Murthi, performed live on the film's audio launch. The song was not included in the album, as Anirudh had to release the song with the tune phrase from the theme song of Annaamalai (1992). For the song, Anirudh roped in veteran composer Deva, to conduct the brass section of the tune; a making video of the song was released in mid-January 2020, went viral on the internet.

Reviewing for the soundtrack album, Behindwoods gave 3 out of 5 statings, "Anirudh packs interesting tunes for every ‘Rajini’ mode, expect the visuals to add more punch." Indiaglitz, gave the same rating and stated "An album which gets you tapping your feet endlessly". Sify stated "the soundtrack album is quite disappointing as compared to Rajinikanth's earlier film Petta, due to the unimpressive lyrics but it touches the listener's soul and enables them to sing along". Moviecrow gave 2.5 out of 5 stars and stated "Anirudh tunes are hardly memorable and the album has no catchy or repeat worthy tracks."

Release

Theatrical
On the announcement of the first look release, the makers also planned to schedule the release, coinciding with the Pongal festival. The film was scheduled to release on 11 January 2020. But in November 2019, the makers announced a new release date of 9 January 2020, to get the benefits of the extended holiday weekend, as Pongal falls on 15 January 2020. The film opened in 7,000 screens worldwide, with 4,000 screens across India.

On 7 January 2020, the High Court restrained the film's release in Malaysia after its producer failed to pay  crore deficit to its distributor. However, later revoked the claims, after Lyca Productions, had showed a bank guarantee of ₹4.9 crores.

Distribution
Dheeraj Enterprises bought the distribution rights of the film in Karnataka. The Hindi dubbed version of the film is sold to Reliance Entertainment, and released the film in the North Indian circuits. Prime Media acquired the US rights, and released the film earlier on 8 January, a day before the Indian release.

Marketing
The motion poster of the film was released on 7 November 2019. Kamal Haasan, Salman Khan, Mohanlal and Mahesh Babu, released the film's posters. The film's trailer was released at a launch event in held in Mumbai on 16 December, with Rajinikanth, Suniel Shetty and Murugadoss being present.

To make the film's promotion more unique, the makers wrapped a SpiceJet airline with Darbar Rajini livery on its flights. The outside branding on the aircraft bearing an image of Rajinikanth in police uniform from the movie Darbar was displayed. This is the second time, a passenger jet had been wrapped for advertising an Indian film, after AirAsia India for Kabali (2016).

Speaking to The Hindu, R. Kannan, COO, Lyca Productions said, "The film will release in 7,000 screens across the world. We are planning to release it in a few islands to reach out to the maximum number of people". Kannan said that around 15 brands such as SpiceJet, Cadbury's, BookMyShow, and Airtel had tied up with the film. "We are spending ₹7–80 million to promote the film. The marketing investment for this film is one of the highest in Tamil cinema".

Home media
The film was made available to stream on OTT platform Amazon Prime on 24 February 2020. The satellite rights of the film were sold to Sun TV.

Critical response 

The film received mixed reviews from critics. The website's critical consensus reads, "Darbar may be Superstar Rajinikanth's first film with hit director A R Murugadoss, but it remains a Rajini film which bows at each step to the continuing myth of the one and only Thalaivar."

Behindwoods wrote "Rajini's Darbar has the substance perfectly laced with Superstar's style and mass" and gave 2.75 out of 5 stars. Film critic Sreedhar Pillai, writing in an article for Firstpost gave 2.75 out of 5 stars and stated "The first half of Darbar is enjoyable mainly due to Rajinikanth's style and swagger." Saibal Chatterjee of NDTV gave 2.5 out of 5 stars and wrote "Darbar is targeted fair and square at Rajinikanth fans, but it does nothing to give masala cinema a fresh shot of energy". Writing for The Times of India, M Suganth gave 3 out of 5 stars and stated "Darbar is an engaging commercial cocktail of action and drama." Shubhra Gupta, editor-in-chief of The Indian Express gave 2.5 out of 5 stars and stated "Darbar remains a Rajinikanth film which bows at each step to the continuing myth of the one and only Thalaivar." A critic from The Hindu stated "Despite A.R. Murugadoss offering very little substance for him to work with, the superstar just about manages to carry this film on his aging shoulders."

Sify gave 2.5 out of 5 stars and stated, "Darbar is an average cop action entertainer packed to satisfy the appetite of the die-hard fans of Thalaivar." Karthik Kumar of the Hindustan Times wrote "AR Murugadoss plays on Rajinikanth's strength and swag, but everything else in this film gets a lackadaisical treatment." Baradwaj Rangan of the Film Companion, stated "The film falls in a no-man's land, where the drama and the action is neither powerful nor punchy enough." India Today gave 2.5 out of 5 stars stating "Barring a clichéd and predictable storyline, Darbar is strictly a film by a Rajinikanth fan for Thalaivar's fans." Sowmya Rajendran of The News Minute gave 2.5 out of 5 stars and stated "Despite being a stale and predictable cop film, it's Rajinikanth's trademark swag that keeps the scenes alive." News18 gave 3 out of 5 stars stating "Darbar is a terrific entertainer that has its shortcomings and dull moments, but Rajinikanth fans won't be disappointed."

Economics

Pre-release revenue 

Box office

India 
The film reportedly minted Rs 180 million in Tamil Nadu alone on its first day. and it has approximately grossed over Rs 110 crore in Tamil Nadu. Chennai city was particularly good for Darbar, where it grossed Rs 14.67 crore. while in Kerala and Karnataka it collected Rs 8 crore and Rs 24 crore respectively. It collected around Rs 23 crore from Andhra Pradesh and Telangana states and around Rs 15 crore from the Hindi version. The film grossed ₹1.35 billion at the domestic box office in the first 11 days.

Other territories 
Darbar grossed over 2 billion worldwide in the 11 days after its release. The film grossed $400,000 (USD) on its opening day in the United States. Just over the opening weekend, Darbar raked in $1 million (7.09 crore) in the US. As of 19 January 2020, the film had crossed $1.6 million (11.36 crore) in the US. Darbar collected approximately 70 crore in the overseas market in the first 11 days.

Re-release in Japan 
The film was re-released in Japan's theatre chain MKC Plex on 16 July as Dalbar Revenge, ran with a full house for a week. The movie, which was supposed to be screened until 21 July, was extended until the end of July. Some reports also suggested that it might run until August in some cities. "Multiple shows are being added for [Darbar] in Japan. Huge demand for tickets there. Distributors are very happy with the profits... According to reports, the movie has created quite a rage among fans. This is likely to be screened in more cities such as Kyoto, Nagoya, and Niigata, among others."

According to media reports, the film has grossed ¥230 million. The film has collected approximately 15 crore (Indian rupee). Darbar is the second highest-grossing movie for Rajinikanth in Japan after Muthu.

Controversies

Political statements 
Darbar includes two scenes in which characters speak of prison inmates being allowed to go out and shop. The dialogues are not mouthed by Rajinikanth in either scene, though the actor is present in the shot in the movie. Lyca Productions announced that it would be removing controversial dialogues in the film, deemed to be a reference to V. K. Sasikala, the jailed associate of former Chief Minister J. Jayalalithaa. Lyca Productions released a statement on Twitter that read: "In Darbar, particular words and dialogues having references to prisoners or inmates going out of jail or prison during their imprisonment was only included with an intention of providing entertainment to the audience and not intended to refer to any specific individual or to offend anyone. However, since some of those words seemed to have hurt some people, we have hereby decided to remove the same from the film." Talking about the same, Sam Daniel from NDTV wrote, "Fans watching superstar Rajinikanth's Darbar will miss his dialogues on irregularities inside prisons which many felt were a tacit dig at jailed Sasikala Natarajan, close friend of late Chief Minister J. Jayalalithaa".

Distributor's losses and impact 
It did not perform well in other states, including Andhra Pradesh and Telangana due to its competition with Ala Vaikunthapurramuloo and Sarileru Neekevvaru, whereas, the Hindi version had a disastrous run at the box-office, due to lack of promotion. After failing to meet Lyca Productions, regarding the film's losses, several distributors tried to approach Rajinikanth demanding compensation. They also threatened with hunger strikes, if the losses were not recouped. According to several industry sources, it became the fourth Rajinikanth-film to incur huge losses for the distributors, after Baba (2002), Kuselan (2008) and Lingaa (2014).

Analysts revealed that the losses resulted due to the huge salaries for the actor and director, lead to a significant increase in the film's production cost.

The impact of Darbar's losses significantly affected his salary for Rajinikanth's Annaatthe as its producers Sun Pictures decided to cut-down 50% of his salary. Sun Pictures who produced Vijay's Thalapathy 65, with Murugadoss as the director, insisted Murugadoss to cut down the salary, citing the underperformance of Darbar and financial constraints owing to the COVID-19 pandemic. Murugadoss refused to do so, and as a result, the production company ousted him from the project and brought Nelson as the director, whose film eventually became Beast (2022).

See also 

 Lingaa loss issue

Notes

References

External links
 
 Darbar on Bollywood Hungama

2020s Tamil-language films
Films scored by Anirudh Ravichander
Films directed by AR Murugadoss
2020 action thriller films
Indian action thriller films
2020 films
Fictional portrayals of the Maharashtra Police
Fictional portrayals of the Delhi Police
Films set in Delhi
Films set in Thailand
Films set in Dubai
Films set in Assam
Films set in Mumbai
Films set in London
Films set in China
Films about the illegal drug trade
Films about organised crime in India
Indian nonlinear narrative films
2020s police procedural films
Films about kidnapping in India
Films about child abduction in India
Films about the Narcotics Control Bureau